James DeVeaux (also spelled De Veaux; 1812–1844) was an American painter.

Biography
James DeVeaux was born in Charleston, South Carolina on September 12, 1812.

He died in Rome on April 28, 1844.

References

1812 births
1844 deaths
Artists from Charleston, South Carolina
American male painters
Painters from South Carolina
19th-century American painters
19th-century American male artists